The 2018 Americas Rugby League Championship was held in Jacksonville, Florida, in November 2018. This tournament was the 3rd Americas Rugby League Championship and the 1st in which a South American national team participated. The tournament also acted as part of the 2021 Men's Rugby League World Cup qualifying. The winning team directly qualified for the 2021 Rugby League World Cup, while the runner-up will progress to the intercontinental repechage in 2019.

Squads

Canada
Shaun McKenzie, Rick Schouten (Abbotsford Griffins, Canada); Christian Miller, Jason Park (Brantford Broncos, Canada); Ash Calvert (Berowra Wallabies, Australia); Josh Kelly (Calgary Cowboys, Canada); Jack Couzens (Coastal Cougars, Canada); Brad Austin (Halswell Hornets, New Zealand); Louis Robinson (London Skolars, UK); Wes Black, Joel Hulett (Ourimbah Magpies, Australia); Rhys Jacks (Sunshine Coast Falcons, Australia); Eddie Bilborough, Antoine Blanc, Emil Borggren, Michael Mastroianni (Toronto City Saints, Canada); Jordan Drew (Townsville Blackhawks, Australia); Ruairi McGoff (Ulverston RL, UK); Sean McInroy (Unattached, Australia); Scyler Dumas, Andrew Porter (Vancouver Dragons, Canada)

Chile
Jonathan Espinoza (Balmoral RLFC), Iziah Catrileo, Bradley Millar, Trent Millar (Brothers Mustangs RLFC), Thomas Garrido, James Horvat (Corrimal Cougars RLFC), Eugene Araya, Chris Brantes, Patrick Camaano, Mana Castillo-Sioni, Nick Doberer, Jaden Laing, Jose Nitor-Alvear, Brandon Tobar (Latin Heat RLFC), Francisco Leiva (Maquinarias RLFC), Piero Diaz (Mariman RLFC), Taylor Salas (Ngen Mapu RLFC), Ferec Cavezas (Rhinos RLFC), Junior Sandoval (Sunbury Tigers RLFC), Zecil Yao (Toros RLFC), Eddie Wegener (West Belconnen Warriors RLFC)

Jamaica
Joel Farrell, Keenen Tomlinson, (Batley Bulldogs), Jonathan Magrin, Ross Peltier (Bradford Bulls) Daniel Thomas (Dewsbury Celtic) Jode Sheriffe (Dewsbury Rams) Aaron Jones-Bishop (Doncaster) Andrae McFarlane, Khamisi McKain, Marvin Thompson, Renaldo Wade (Duhaney Park), James Woodburn-Hall (Halifax ) Ashton Golding (Leeds Rhinos) Joseph Brown, Mo Agoro (Newcastle) Jacob Ogden (London Broncos) Jy-Mel Coleman, Lamont Bryan, Omari Caro (London Skolars), Ben Jones-Bishop (Wakefield), Alex Brown (Unattached)

United States
Nick Newlin (Atlanta Rhinos), Ryan Burroughs (Barrow Raiders), Brandon Anderson, Jamil Robinson, (Brooklyn Kings), Jerome Veve (Burleigh Bears), Haveatama “Joel” Luani (Canterbury-Bankstown Bulldogs), Chris Wiggins (Delaware Black Foxes), Bureta Faraimo (Hull FC), Kyle Grinold, David Washington (Jacksonville Axemen), Chris Frazier (NOVA Eagles), Curtis Goddard (Southwest Florida Copperheads), Andrew Kneisly (Philadelphia Fight), Cory Makelim, Mark Offerdahl (Sheffield Eagles), Connor Donehue (Sunshine Coast Falcons), Joe Eichner (Junee Diesels), Danny Howard (Wentworth Magpies), Kristian Freed (Wests Mitchelton)

Bracket

Fixtures

Semi-finals

Play-offs

References

2021 Rugby League World Cup
2018 in rugby league
Rugby League America's Cup
2018 in Jamaican rugby league
2018 in Canadian rugby league
2018 in American rugby league
Americas Rugby League Championship
Americas Rugby League Championship